Lupeosaurus is an extinct genus of pelycosaurian synapsids, assigned to the family Edaphosauridae.

See also
 List of pelycosaurs

References

Edaphosaurids
Prehistoric synapsid genera
Cisuralian synapsids of North America
Taxa named by Alfred Romer
Fossil taxa described in 1937
Cisuralian genus first appearances
Cisuralian genus extinctions